The Kelowna Spartans were a Junior "A" ice hockey team from Kelowna, British Columbia, Canada. They were a part of the British Columbia Hockey League.

Kelowna Packers 1985 - 1989
Kelowna Spartans 1989 - 1995

History
The Kelowna Packers joined the BCJHL in 1985 to fill the void left by the Kelowna Buckaroos who left Kelowna, British Columbia in 1983. They changed their names to the Spartans in 1989.

In 1993, the Spartans won the BCJHL title, and moved on to the Mowat Cup for the British Columbia title and defeated the Williams Lake Mustangs of the Rocky Mountain Junior Hockey League 3-games-to-none.  They faced the Olds Grizzlys of the Alberta Junior Hockey League, winning the Doyle Cup 4-games-to-1 to earn a birth to the Centennial Cup.

At the Centennial Cup 1993, the Spartans first defeated the Chateauguay Elites of the Quebec Junior AAA Hockey League 8-3.  In game two, they defeated the Antigonish Bulldogs of the Maritime Junior A Hockey League 10-4.  In game three, they beat the host Amherst Ramblers, also of the MJAHL, 5-2.  In the final game of the round robin, they beat the Flin Flon Bombers of the Saskatchewan Junior Hockey League 4-3, to finish the round perfect and won the Abbott Cup.  In the semi-final, the Spartans beat the Bulldogs again, 4-1, to earn a birth into the Final.  They won that final 7-2 against the Quebec Champions of the LHJAAAQ to win their only National Title.

In 1994, the Spartans again won the league again.  At the Mowat Cup, the Spartans beat the RMJHL representatives, the Kimberley Dynamiters, 3-games-to-0.  In the Doyle Cup, for the second straight year they played the Olds Grizzlys but lost this time 4-games-to-2.

Even though they lost to Olds, they were automatically given a berth in the 1994 Centennial Cup as Olds was the host team. They started it off with a 5-2 victory over the SJHL's Weyburn Red Wings.  In game two, Kelowna beat the Antigonish Bulldogs 5-4.  The third game put them up again against Olds, but again losing to them 5-2.  In game four, the Spartans beat the Chateauguay Elites 9-6 to clinch second place in the Round Robin.  In the Semi-final, they again faced the Elites and beat them 3-1 to earn a birth to the Final.  The final was against the Grizzlies and the Spartans pushed them to the brink.  In the end, the Grizzlies came out on top in overtime, winning 5-4.

In 1995, the Spartans disbanded to make room for the Kelowna Rockets' Western Hockey League team.

Season-by-season record
Note: GP = Games Played, W = Wins, L = Losses, T = Ties, OTL = Overtime Losses, GF = Goals for, GA = Goals against

Notable alumni
Greg Andrusak
Jan Bulis
Willie Mitchell
Bill Muckalt
Jason Ruff
Joel Savage

See also
List of ice hockey teams in British Columbia

Defunct British Columbia Hockey League teams
1985 establishments in British Columbia
1995 disestablishments in British Columbia
Ice hockey clubs established in 1985
Sports clubs disestablished in 1995
Sport in Kelowna